Chris Gittins MBE (4 July 1902 – 21 August 1988) was a British character actor who played the role of Walter Gabriel in the long-running BBC radio series The Archers.

Gittins was born in Stourbridge, Worcestershire, where he also died. He was the son of a gas fitter who became involved with the theatre as an actor, producer and director, later alternating between the theatre and radio. His first radio part was on 13 November 1935.  He specialised in Black Country and The Midlands accents.  As well as The Archers and radio plays he took part in Children's Hour and the British Forces Broadcasting Service.

He played the role of Walter Gabriel, a tenant farmer, in The Archers for 35 years from 1953 to 1988, and was known nationally for the character's phrases "Oh dear, oh lor" and "Me old pal, me old beauty".  He also appeared in several TV series including Hilda Lessways (1959) and Swizzlewick (1964).

He died as a widower, leaving one daughter.  He was awarded the MBE in 1984.

Notes

1902 births
1988 deaths
Members of the Order of the British Empire
The Archers
English male radio actors